Iris Maud Sadler (22 March 1908 – 12 January 1991) was an English actress, best known for her role as Gladys the tea lady in the television sitcom Mind Your Language, from 1977 to 1979 in which she appeared in 20 episodes. Her film credits include Mrs. Brown, You’ve Got a Lovely Daughter (1968).

References

External links 
 

1908 births
1991 deaths
People from Forest Gate
English film actresses
English television actresses
Actresses from London
20th-century English actresses